Helicopter Sea Combat Squadron 26 (HSC-26), nicknamed the "Chargers", is a United States Navy helicopter squadron based at Naval Station Norfolk, Virginia. The squadron was established on 1 September 1967 as Helicopter Combat Support Squadron 6 (HC-6), before being redesignated to its current name on 24 August 2005. Since 2005, the squadron's Detachment 1, nicknamed the "Desert Hawks", have been stationed at Naval Support Activity Bahrain, conducting combat support for the United States Fifth Fleet. In 2017, HSC-26 deployed aboard  to provide disaster relief to the U.S. Virgin Islands and Puerto Rico in the aftermath of Hurricanes Irma, Jose and Maria. In 2021, members of HSC-26 deployed to the Gulf of Oman aboard .

References 

Helicopter sea combat squadrons of the United States Navy